Carolina Beach State Park is a North Carolina state park in New Hanover County, North Carolina. The state owns  of the park in fee simple, and the remainder of park land is leased from the Department of the Army. The park is located along the Cape Fear River and Snow's Cut (part of the Intracoastal Waterway).

Pocosin wetlands, a type of wetland that supports rare carnivorous plant species, are found in the park. Carnivorous plants found at this park include Venus flytraps, pitcher plants, butterworts and bladderworts.

The park features six miles of hiking trails. Other amenities include a marina, campsites, picnic area, and a visitor's center featuring natural history exhibits.

References

External links
 
 

State parks of North Carolina
Protected areas of New Hanover County, North Carolina
Protected areas established in 1969
Nature centers in North Carolina